If Only a Sweet Surrender to the Nights to Come Be True is the debut album by Esmerine. It was released on June 2, 2003.

Track listing 
 "Red Fire Farm" - 4:33
 "There Were No Footprints in the Dust Behind Them..." - 12:27
 "Nohna's Lullaby" - 5:43
 "Where There Is No Love There Is No Justice" - 5:52
 "Tungsten" - 5:30
 "Sweet Surrender Be True" - 7:49   
 "Luna Park" - 1:26
 "Marvellous Engines of Resistance" – 7:07

References

2003 debut albums
Esmerine albums